Thippagondanahalli Reservoir, also known as T G Halli Dam or Chamarajasagara, is located at the confluence of the Arkavathy and Kumudavathi rivers,  west of Bangalore, India. It is used by the Bangalore Water Supply and Sewerage Board as a major source of drinking water for western Bangalore. The lake is a man-made reservoir, created by the building of a dam which was inaugurated in 1933. M. Visvesvaraya supervised the construction work.

Water crisis
In the summer of 2007, the lack of rain in the watershed for the reservoir, along with use of the water for the city ran the lake almost dry.

Recreational use 

Thippagondanahalli is also popular recreation location, especially during summer months. It is located on Magadi road. There is one more dam at Manchanabele in Arkavathy downstream.

See also 
Dodda Alada Mara
Lakes in Bangalore
Savandurga

References

Tourist attractions in Bangalore
Dams in Karnataka
Reservoirs in Karnataka
Buildings and structures in Bangalore Rural district
Tourist attractions in Bangalore Rural district
Geography of Bangalore Rural district
Hindu temples in Bangalore Rural district
1930s establishments in India
Dams completed in the 1930s
20th-century architecture in India